Arthur Jay England Jr. (December 23, 1932 – August 1, 2013) was an American jurist and lawyer.

Born in Dayton, Ohio, England served in the United States Army in counter-intelligence. He then received his degrees from the Wharton School of the University of Pennsylvania and the University of Miami School of Law. He then practiced law in Florida. He served on the Florida Supreme Court 1975–1981 and was the chief justice of the court 1978–1980. He died in Coral Gables, Florida.

Notes

1932 births
2013 deaths
People from Coral Gables, Florida
Politicians from Dayton, Ohio
Wharton School of the University of Pennsylvania alumni
University of Miami School of Law alumni
Florida lawyers
Chief Justices of the Florida Supreme Court
Deaths from pulmonary fibrosis
Justices of the Florida Supreme Court
20th-century American judges
20th-century American lawyers